This is a list of civil parishes in the ceremonial county of Devon, England. There are 426 civil parishes.

East Devon

Exeter
The former Exeter County Borough is unparished.

Mid Devon
The whole of the district is parished.

North Devon
The whole of the district is parished.

Plymouth
The former Plymouth County Borough is unparished.

South Hams
The whole of the district is parished.

Teignbridge
The whole of the district is parished.

Torbay
Part of the former Torbay County Borough is unparished.

Brixham (town) 40

Torridge
The former Lundy civil parish is unparished

West Devon
The whole of the borough is parished.

Notes

See also
 List of civil parishes in England

References

External links
 Office for National Statistics : Geographical Area Listings

Civil parishes
Devon
 
Civil parishes